Douglas Kieshawn Sheref Whitehead (born September 7, 1996), known professionally as Dougie or Dougie On The Beat, is an American record producer born and raised in Philadelphia, Pennsylvania. Dougie has produced some of Meek's biggest singles to date, including, “1942 Flows,” “Issues,” and “Save Me," which all appear on his 2017 album Wins & Losses.

Early life
Dougie began his musical career by rapping. He grew up in a large family, and recalls his dad playing and listening to a lot of Nas and Jay-Z.

As he developed his own tastes, Dougie began listening to a range of artists including Nas, Jay-Z, Scarface, Biggie, Tupac, and KRS-One.

In his teenage years, Dougie was exposed to his uncle's program called Music Development For The Youth where he learned the creative process behind making a song and how studio equipment works. It was then that Dougie claims he fell in love with producing and proceeded to make his first-ever beat.

Career
After sending Meek Mill and his engineer beats for a year, Dougie finally met with Meek and the two released a series of popular singles resulting in Dougie's first and second placement.

Dougie prides himself in having a versatile sound that defies categorization. He told Philadelphia Weekly in 2017, “I don't really try to sound like other people. I just do what I do.”

Dougie's first RIAA placement was Meek Mill's “1942 Flows,” which was certified Platinum. Meek Mill's “Issues,” was certified Gold as well. The placements were unknown by Dougie until a fan pointed out the success of the singles on social media, according to Dougie.

Other chart placements include “Feelings” off G Herbo's recent album PTSD and “Florida Boy” by Rick Ross, Kodak Black, and T-Pain.

Dougie currently has forthcoming collaborations with Dave East, Trey Songz, and Giggs among others.

Production discography

References 

1996 births
Living people
American hip hop record producers